The Responsible Government Association (RGA), called the Rhodesia Party from 1923, was a political party in Southern Rhodesia. Founded in 1917, it initially advocated responsible government for Southern Rhodesia within the British Empire, as opposed to incorporation into the Union of South Africa. When responsible government was achieved in 1923, the party became the governing Rhodesia Party. It endured until 1934, when it merged with the right wing of the Reform Party to create the United Party, which remained in power for 28 years afterwards, and was itself defunct by 1965.

History

Responsible Government Association (1917–23)
Led by Sir Charles Coghlan, a Bulawayo lawyer originally from South Africa, the RGA was formed in 1917, and fought the 1920 election to the colony's Legislative Council. The party's main platform was one in favour of responsible government for Southern Rhodesia within the British Empire, and against incorporation into the Union of South Africa, which had been formed in 1910 by the British South Africa Act, 1909. In this campaign the RGA was allied to the Labour Party, whilst its main opponents were the Unionists, who advocated integration into South Africa. A government referendum was organised in 1922, and responsible government won the day. Southern Rhodesia was duly made self-governing and semi-independent within the Empire in October 1923.

Rhodesia Party (1923–34)
Coghlan became the first Premier of Southern Rhodesia, and the party continued as the Rhodesia Party, which had a broader base of support, including a number of former unionists in its cabinet. It remained in power until September 1933, when the party narrowly topped the popular vote, but lost the election, winning only nine of the 30 seats compared to the Reform Party's 16. Although the Reform Party was left-wing in name, many of its leading members, including the new prime minister Dr Godfrey Huggins, were politically conservative; the Rhodesia Party merged with the Reform Party's more rightist members in 1934 to form the United Party.

Legacy
With Huggins at the helm, the United Party roundly defeated the rump left wing of the Reform Party in an election held the same year. The United Party thereafter remained in government for nearly three decades, with Huggins leading it until his retirement in 1956. The party renamed itself the United Rhodesia Party in 1953, soon after Southern Rhodesia was federated with Northern Rhodesia and Nyasaland, and merged with the Federal Party in 1958 to become the United Federal Party. Its leaders included Garfield Todd and Edgar Whitehead, both of whom pursued mildly reformist policies which led to expanded political participation by black Africans. It was removed from power by the Rhodesian Front's 1962 electoral victory, and was inactive by 1965.

The Rhodesia Party name was revived twice. Following the UFP's electoral defeat in 1962, the opposition would regroup under the RP moniker and Roy Welensky unsuccessfully attempted to re-enter Parliament, pursuing a moderate platform in opposition to the RF government and UDI. In 1973, the name was revived again by white moderates who entered the 1974 election on a reformist platform but won no seats.

Notes and references
Notes

References

Bibliography

1917 establishments in Southern Rhodesia
1934 disestablishments in Southern Rhodesia
Defunct political parties in Zimbabwe
Liberal parties in Zimbabwe
Political parties disestablished in 1934
Political parties established in 1917
Political parties in Rhodesia